Lance Alan King (born 13 August 1963) is a former speedway rider from the United States.

Speedway career 
King was a leading speedway rider during the early 1980s reaching three Speedway World Championship finals in 1983, 1984 and 1985. He was the Overseas champion in 1984 and won the bronze medal in the 1984 World final, losing the silver medal run off against Hans Nielsen.

He rode in the top tier of British Speedway riding for Cradley Heath, Bradford Dukes and King's Lynn Stars from 1982 until 1989.

World Final appearances

World Team Cup
 1983 -  Vojens, Speedway Center (with Dennis Sigalos / Bobby Schwartz / Kelly Moran) – 3rd – 27pts (6)

References 

1963 births
Living people
American speedway riders
Bradford Dukes riders
Cradley Heathens riders
King's Lynn Stars riders